The TAM 150 T11 B/BV is a general-purpose off-road lorry made by Slovenian vehicle manufacturer Tovarna avtomobilov Maribor (TAM). The six-wheel-drive lorry was designed for use by the Yugoslav People's Army, in the transport of personnel, weapons, and materials.

Development
In 1965, the Department for Traffic of the Federal Secretariat of People's Defense, formed a workgroup to analyse the unarmored vehicles of the Yugoslav People's Army. A study was produced by the workgroup, which concluded that there were 129 different vehicle models in 320 types of service.  

The study prompted, in 1966, the Main Military Technical Council to reduce the number of vehicle models in service, through the development of five vehicle classes: 0.75-ton 4x4 off-road vehicle, 1.5-ton 4x4 off-road truck, 3-ton 6x6 off-road truck, 6-ton 6x6 off-road truck and 9-ton 8x8 heavy off-road truck. 

In 1976, the plan for 1.5-ton 4x4 off-road trucks was realised, by Tovarna avtomobilov Maribor, with the TAM 110 T7 B/BV, developed from a Magirus-Deutz design. The design of the TAM 150 T11 B/BV was based was on that of the TAM 110 T7 B/BV, and it was produced from 1979.

Variants
The standard variant has a short cab with canvas and a standard cargo bed and is used for transport of personnel (18 + 2 troops with equipment) and materials (such as a tractor for artillery and anti-aircraft artillery weapons).

The variant with hardtop cab is used for different bodyworks - mobile NBC decontamination tanker truck (ACD M.78), communications vehicle, mobile workshop, and fire truck (M-77).

The standard TAM 150 T7 B/BV with canvas cab has been used as a platform for the M-94 Plamen-S self-propelled multiple rocket launcher and as a platform for the Košava rocket launcher.

BOV family armoured vehicles have been developed on a TAM 150 T11 base.

Operators
TAM 150 T11 B/BV was mainly produced for the needs of the Yugoslav People's Army and milicija. A number of vehicles have been exported to Middle Eastern countries during the 1980s.

After the breakup of Yugoslavia, most vehicles were passed to successor states. Today, the TAM 150 T7 B/BV is used by the militaries of Serbia, Slovenia, Croatia, Bosnia and Herzegovina, Republic of Macedonia and Montenegro. They are also used by special police forces such as the Serbian Gendarmery.

Technical data

Dimensions
Length - 6550 mm
Width - 2275 mm
Height - 2420
Height without roof and windshield - 2820 mm
Wheelbase - 3100
Cargo bed internal dimensions:
Length - 4170 mm
Width - 2120 mm
Height - 500 mm

Weight
Curb weight - 6400 kg
Load capacity on-road - 3000 kg
Load capacity off-road - 5000 kg

References 

 Military trucks
 Military equipment of Yugoslavia